Gare de Vire is a railway station serving the subprefecture of Vire-Normandie, Calvados department, northwestern France.

Services

The station is served by regional trains to Argentan, Paris and Granville.

References

External links
 

Railway stations in Calvados
Railway stations in France opened in 1867